The Wheat Head Armyworm (Dargida diffusa) is a moth of the family Noctuidae. It is found in most of North America, except Yukon and Alaska.

The wingspan is 27–36 mm. Adults are on wing from May to September depending on the location.

The larvae feed on seed heads of cereal crops and grasses, especially Phleum pratense.

Subspecies
Dargida diffusa obscurior (Smith, 1902)
Dargida diffusa limitata (Smith, 1902)
Dargida diffusa neptis (Smith, 1902)

External links
Bug Guide
Species info

Hadeninae
Moths described in 1856
Moths of North America
Agricultural pest insects